Kusans is a village in the municipality of Ingå in Southern coastal Finland.

Villages in Finland
Ingå